Patrick Ian Woodcock (born April 27, 1977) is a former Canadian football wide receiver.

Woodcock attended American College at Syracuse University between 1997 and 2000 and he attended Holy Trinity Catholic High School, which is located in Kanata, Ontario. He was signed as a free agent by the New York Giants of the National Football League in 2001 and made two appearances on special teams, returning six kickoffs for 113 yards and two punts for 16 yards, but was released in Week 3.  He was then signed by the Montreal Alouettes of the CFL where he went on to win a Grey Cup with them in 2002. In 2003, he was signed by the Washington Redskins of the NFL but was released by them, and he was then re-signed by the Alouettes. He was signed by the Ottawa Renegades in 2004. In 2006, he was selected in the fourth round (32nd overall) by the Edmonton Eskimos in the Renegades' dispersal draft.

In March 2008, Woodcock signed with the Hamilton Tiger-Cats as a free agent. 

He previously held the Grey Cup record for longest TD reception, a 99-yard catch, in Montreal's 90th Grey Cup victory. That record has since been broken during the 105th Grey Cup game.

References

1977 births
Living people
Canadian football wide receivers
Canadian players of American football
Edmonton Elks players
Montreal Alouettes players
Ottawa Renegades players
Canadian football people from Ottawa
Players of Canadian football from Ontario
Syracuse Orange football players